Laurentia is a Canadian drama film, directed by Mathieu Denis and Simon Lavoie and released in 2011. A meditation on Québécois identity which draws its title from the philosophical concept of Laurentie that was an early precursor to the contemporary Quebec sovereignty movement, the film stars Emmanuel Schwartz as Louis Desprès, an audiovisual technician in Montreal who sinks into a malaise of depression and identity crisis as he becomes increasingly distrustful and suspicious of his new anglophone immigrant neighbour Jay Kashyap (Jade Hassouné).

The film's cast also includes Eugénie Beaudry, Guillaume Cyr, Martin Boily and Simon Gfeller.

The film was screened at the 2011 Cannes Film Market as part of Telefilm Canada's annual Perspectives Canada program, and had its public premiere at the 46th Karlovy Vary International Film Festival. It had its Canadian premiere at the 2011 Festival du nouveau cinéma.

The film faced some controversy for a scene which featured the lead character masturbating.

Awards

The film won the award for Best International Film at the 2012 Raindance Film Festival, and Denis and Lavoie won the award for best director at the 2012 Polar Lights film festival in Saint Petersburg.

References

External links

2011 films
2011 drama films
Canadian drama films
Films set in Montreal
Films shot in Montreal
Films directed by Mathieu Denis
Films directed by Simon Lavoie
2010s French-language films
2010s Canadian films